Niobium pentoxide is the inorganic compound with the formula Nb2O5. A colorless, insoluble, and fairly unreactive solid, it is the most widespread precursor for other compounds and materials containing niobium. It is predominantly used in alloying, with other specialized applications in capacitors, optical glasses, and the production of lithium niobate.

Structure
It has many polymorphic forms all based largely on octahedrally coordinated niobium atoms. The polymorphs are identified with a variety of prefixes. The form most commonly encountered is monoclinic H-Nb2O5, which has a complex structure with a unit cell containing 28 niobium atoms and 70 oxygen, where 27 of the niobium atoms are octahedrally coordinated and one tetrahedrally. There is an uncharacterised solid hydrate, the so-called niobic acid (previously called columbic acid), which can be prepared by hydrolysis of a basic solution of niobium pentachloride or Nb2O5 dissolved in HF.

Molten niobium pentoxide has lower mean coordination numbers than the crystalline forms, with a structure comprising mostly NbO5 and NbO6 polyhedra.

Production

Hydrolysis
Nb2O5 is prepared by hydrolysis of alkali-metal niobates, alkoxides or fluoride using base. Such ostensibly simple procedures afford hydrated oxides that can then be calcined. Pure Nb2O5 can  also be prepared by hydrolysis of NbCl5:
2 NbCl5 + 5 H2O → Nb2O5 + 10 HCl
A method of production via sol-gel techniques has been reported hydrolysing niobium alkoxides in the presence of acetic acid, followed by calcination of the gels to produce the orthorhombic form, T-Nb2O5.

Oxidation
Given that Nb2O5 is the most common and robust compound of niobium, many methods, both practical and esoteric, exist for its formation. The oxide for example, arises when niobium metal is oxidised in air. The oxidation of niobium dioxide, NbO2 in air forms the polymorph, L-Nb2O5. 

Nano-sized niobium pentoxide particles have been synthesized by LiH reduction of NbCl5, followed by aerial oxidation as part of a synthesis of nano structured niobates.

Reactions
Nb2O5 is attacked by HF and dissolves in fused alkali.

Reduction to the metal
The conversion of Nb2O5 is the main route for the industrial production of niobium metal. In the 1980s, about 15,000,000 kg of Nb2O5 were consumed annually for reduction to the metal. The main method is reduction of this oxide with aluminium:
3 Nb2O5 + 10 Al   →   6 Nb + 5 Al2O3

An alternative but less practiced route involves carbothermal reduction, which proceeds via reduction with carbon and forms the basis of the two stage Balke process:
Nb2O5 + 7 C → 2 NbC + 5 CO (heated under vacuum at 1800 °C)
5 NbC + Nb2O5  → 7 Nb + 5 CO

Conversion to halides
Many methods are known for conversion of Nb2O5 to the halides.  The main problem is incomplete reaction to give the oxyhalides. In the laboratory, the conversion can be effected with thionyl chloride: 
Nb2O5 + 5 SOCl2   →   2 NbCl5 + 5 SO2
Nb2O5 reacts with CCl4 to give niobium oxychloride NbOCl3.

Conversion to niobates
Treating Nb2O5 with aqueous NaOH at 200 °C can give crystalline sodium niobate, NaNbO3 whereas the reaction with KOH may yield soluble Lindqvist-type hexaniobates, . Lithium niobates such as LiNbO3 and Li3NbO4 can be prepared by reaction lithium carbonate and Nb2O5.

Conversion to reduced niobium oxides
High temperature reduction with H2 gives NbO2:
Nb2O5 + H2 → 2 NbO2 +  H2O

Niobium monooxide arises from a comproportionation using an arc-furnace:
Nb2O5 + 3Nb →  5 NbO

The burgundy-coloured niobium(III) oxide, one of the first superconducting oxides, can be prepared again by an comproportionation:
Li3NbO4 + 2 NbO →  3 LiNbO2

Uses
Niobium pentoxide is used mainly in the production of niobium metal, but specialized applications exist in the production of optical glasses and lithium niobate.

Thin films of Nb2O5 form the dielectric layers in niobium electrolytic capacitors.

Nb2O5 have been considered for use as an anode in a lithium ion battery, given that their ordered crystalline structure allows charging speeds of 225 mAh g−1 at 200 mA g−1 across 400 cycles, at a Coulombic efficiency of 99.93%.

External links
 Basic Niobium Information and Research Data

References

Niobium(V) compounds
Transition metal oxides